Tomșani may refer to several places in Romania:

 Tomșani, Prahova, a commune in Prahova County
 Tomșani, Vâlcea, a commune in Vâlcea County
 Tomșani, a village in Costeștii din Vale Commune, Dâmbovița County